The William and Mary Shelton Farmstead is located in Seven Mile Creek, Wisconsin, United States. It was added to the National Register of Historic Places in 2004.

History
William Shelton moved to the property in 1907 after he married Mary Powers, the daughter of the landowner. Both the Shelton and Powers families were Irish immigrants. William and Mary's descendants continue to own the property.

References

Farms on the National Register of Historic Places in Wisconsin
Geography of Juneau County, Wisconsin
National Register of Historic Places in Juneau County, Wisconsin